North Cheshire is a former United Kingdom parliamentary constituency. It was created upon the division of Cheshire in 1832. In 1868 it was abolished with South Cheshire to form East Cheshire, Mid Cheshire, West Cheshire and Stalybridge.

History
North Cheshire, or the Northern Division of Cheshire, was created as a two-member constituency under the Representation of the People Act 1832 (Great Reform Act) as one of 2 divisions, along with South Cheshire, of the Parliamentary County of Cheshire. It comprised the Hundreds of Macclesfield and Bucklow.

Under the Reform Act 1867, Cheshire was further divided with the creation of Mid Cheshire, to which the Bucklow Hundred was transferred. North Cheshire, now comprising the Hundred of Macclesfield was renamed East Cheshire by the Boundaries Act 1868.

Members of Parliament

Elections

 Caused by Egerton's resignation by accepting the office of Steward of the Manor of Northstead

 Caused by elevation of Edward Stanley to the House of Lords as Lord Eddisbury

See also
List of former United Kingdom Parliament constituencies
History of parliamentary constituencies and boundaries in Cheshire

References

Parliamentary constituencies in Cheshire (historic)
Constituencies of the Parliament of the United Kingdom established in 1832
Constituencies of the Parliament of the United Kingdom disestablished in 1868